Sai Sudharsan (born 15 October 2001) is an Indian cricketer, who has played in the Tamil Nadu Premier League. In 2019/20 Raja of Palayampatti Shield, he was Alwarpet CC's leading run-scorer with 635 runs at an average of 52.92. He made his Twenty20 debut on 4 November 2021, for Tamil Nadu in the 2021–22 Syed Mushtaq Ali Trophy. He made his List A debut on 8 December 2021, for Tamil Nadu in the 2021–22 Vijay Hazare Trophy. In February 2022, he was bought by the Gujarat Titans in the auction for the 2022 Indian Premier League (IPL) tournament. In April 2022, he made his IPL debut after Vijay Shankar was ruled out of the match due to an injury.

Sudarshan's father was an athlete who represented India at the South Asian Games in Dhaka, while his mother was a state level volleyball player.

References

External links
 

2001 births
Living people
Indian cricketers
Gujarat Titans cricketers
Tamil Nadu cricketers
Place of birth missing (living people)